Battle Island State Park is a  state park located on the Oswego River in Oswego County, New York. Included within the park is the 18-hole Battle Island State Park Golf Course. The park is located on the west bank of the river, north of the City of Fulton, along New York State Highway 48.

History
Battle Island State Park's name refers to a battle that took place on a nearby island on July 3, 1756, during the French and Indian War. The battle commenced after a British fleet, returning from delivering supplies to Fort Ontario, was ambushed by a party of French and Indians. Although outnumbered, British and Colonial forces were able repulse several attacks by using the island as a stronghold. The island identified on maps as "Battle Island" was created during the excavation of an adjacent canal; the battle actually took place on a smaller island just to the south.

Battle Island State Park occupies land originally owned by Frederick A. Emerick, who deeded  of the park's property to the state in 1916. When the remainder of his property was turned over to the state in 1938, the land was officially designated as a state park.

Facilities
One of the park's main attractions is its 18-hole, par 72 golf course, designed by Devereux Emmett.

The park also offers trails for cross-country skiing and a food concession.

See also
 List of New York state parks

References

External links
 New York State Parks: Battle Island State Park
 New York State Parks: Battle Island State Park Golf Course

State parks of New York (state)
Parks in Oswego County, New York
Golf clubs and courses in New York (state)
Protected areas established in 1938
1938 establishments in New York (state)